The Bailey–Rugg Building was a historic commercial building located at 219–225 North Neil Street in Champaign, Illinois.

Description and history 
Businessmen David Bailey and Daniel Rugg built the building as a joint venture in 1871; each merchant occupied half of the building, with a common staircase connecting the two halves. The three-story, brick building had an Italianate design. The tall, narrow windows on the second and third stories featured arched stone hoods; the arches on the front windows were divided by keystones. A metal cornice with ornamental bracketing and panels ran below the flat roof.

The building was added to the National Register of Historic Places on November 7, 1997.

In 2008, eleven years to the date after its National Register listing, the building burned down in an unexplained fire.  It was removed from the National Register in 2020.

References

Commercial buildings on the National Register of Historic Places in Illinois
Italianate architecture in Illinois
Commercial buildings completed in 1871
National Register of Historic Places in Champaign County, Illinois
Buildings and structures in Champaign, Illinois
Former National Register of Historic Places in Illinois